Oliver is a surname derived from the personal name Oliver.  The Scottish Oliver family was a sept of the Scotland Highlands' powerful Clan Fraser of Lovat.

People with the surname "Oliver" include

A
Adam Oliver (politician) (1823–1882), Canadian businessman
Adam Oliver (footballer) (born 1980), English footballer
Adrian Oliver (born 1988), American basketball player
Al Oliver (born 1946), American baseball player
Albert Oliver (born 1978), Spanish basketball player
Alexandra Oliver (born 1970), Canadian poet
Alfred Oliver (1882–??), Welsh footballer
Alison Oliver (born 1997), Irish actress
Allan Roy Oliver (1936–2021), Canadian politician
Allen Oliver (born 1924), English footballer
Allen J. Oliver (1903–1953), American politician
Amy Oliver (born 1987), British archer
Andi Oliver, British chef
Andrew Oliver (disambiguation), multiple people
Andy Oliver (born 1987), American baseball player
Anna Oliver (1840–1892), American preacher
Anthony Oliver (1922–1995), Welsh actor
Anton Oliver (born 1975), New Zealand rugby league footballer
Antonio Oliver (1903–1968), Spanish writer
Archer James Oliver (1774–1842), British painter
Arnie Oliver (1907–1993), American soccer player
Arnold Oliver (born 1954), Trinidadian cricketer
Art Oliver (1911–1944), American boxer
Arthur Oliver (disambiguation), multiple people

B
Barret Oliver (born 1973), American actor
Ben Oliver (disambiguation), multiple people
Bernard M. Oliver (1919–1995), American scientist
Beryl Oliver (1882–1972), British charity administrator
Bill Oliver (disambiguation), multiple people
Bob Oliver (1943–2020), American baseball player
Bobbie Oliver (born 1943), Canadian painter
Branden Oliver (born 1991), American football player
Brian Oliver (disambiguation), multiple people
Bronwyn Oliver (1959–2006), Australian sculptor

C
Cameron Oliver (born 1996), American basketball player
Carl Oliver (born 1969), Bahamian sprinter
Catriona Oliver (born 1980), Australian rower
Célestin Oliver (1930–2011), French footballer
Chad Oliver (1928–1993), American novelist
Charles Oliver (disambiguation), multiple people
Chase Oliver (born 1984/1985), American politician
C. Herbert Oliver (1925–2021), American activist
Chip Oliver (born 1944), American football player
Chris Oliver (disambiguation), multiple people
Christian Oliver (born 1975), German actor
Clancy Oliver (born 1947), American football player
Clare Oliver (1981–2007), Australian activist
Clarence Paul Oliver (1898–1991), American geneticist
Clayton Oliver (born 1997), Australian rules footballer
Codie Elaine Oliver, American television producer
Collin Oliver (born 2002), American football player
Concepción Blasco Oliver (1858–1938), Spanish philanthropist
Conor Oliver (born 1995), Irish rugby union footballer
Covey T. Oliver (1913–2007), American diplomat
Craig Oliver (disambiguation), multiple people

D
Dale Oliver (born 1970), American composer
Damien Oliver (born 1972), Australian jockey
Daniel Oliver (disambiguation), multiple people
Darren Oliver (born 1970), American baseball player
Darren Oliver (footballer) (born 1971), English footballer
Dave Oliver (born 1951), American baseball coach
David Oliver (disambiguation), multiple people
Dawn Oliver (born 1942), British legal scholar
Dean Oliver (disambiguation), multiple people
Deanna Oliver (born 1952), American actress
Demetrius Oliver (born 1975), American artist
Dent Oliver (1918–1973), English racing driver
Derek Oliver (born 1984), Scottish lawn bowler
Des Oliver (1930–1997), New Zealand rugby union player
Desmond Oliver (basketball) (born 1969), American basketball coach
Devin Oliver (born 1992), American basketball player
Diane Oliver (1943–1966), American activist
Dick Oliver (1939–2016), American television reporter
Donald Oliver (born 1938), Canadian politician 
Don Oliver (1937–1996), New Zealand weightlifter
Don Oliver (rugby union) (1909–1990), New Zealand rugby union player
Douglas Oliver (1937–2000), American poet

E
Ed Oliver (disambiguation), multiple people
Edward Oliver (disambiguation), multiple people
Edna May Oliver (1883–1942), American actress
Eileen I. Oliver, American professor
Emma Oliver (1819–1885), English artist
Eric Oliver (disambiguation), multiple people

F
Farquhar Oliver (1904–1989), Canadian politician
Francesc Tomàs Oliver (1850–1903), Spanish anarchist
Francis Oliver (disambiguation), multiple people
Francisco Oliver (born 1995), Argentinian footballer
Francisco Torres Oliver (born 1935), Spanish translator
Frank Oliver (disambiguation), multiple people

G
Garrett Oliver (born 1962), American brewer
Gary Oliver (born 1995), Scottish footballer
Gary Oliver (actor) (born 1966), English actor
Gavin Oliver (born 1962), English footballer
Gene Oliver (1913–2007), American baseball player
Gene Oliver (American football), American football player
Geoffrey Oliver (1898–1980), British admiral
George Oliver (disambiguation), multiple people
Georgina Oliver (born 1992), English track and field athlete
Gillian Oliver (born 1943), British nursing administrator
Glynis Oliver, Welsh comic book artist
Gordon Oliver (1910–1995), American film producer
Grace A. Oliver (1844–1899), American author
Greg Oliver (born 1971), Canadian sports writer
Greig Oliver (born 1964), Scottish rugby union footballer
Guillermo Oliver (born 1955), Uruguayan-American scientist
Guy Oliver (1889–1932), American actor

H
Harry Oliver (disambiguation), multiple people
Helen Elizabeth Oliver (1896–1934), American singer
Henry Oliver (disambiguation), multiple people
Hubie Oliver (born 1957), American football player

I
Ian Oliver (1940–2022), British police officer
Ilrey Oliver (1962–2002), Jamaican sprinter
Ingrid Oliver (born 1977), British actress
Isaac Oliver (1565–1617) French-English painter
Isaac Oliver (writer), American author
Isabel Jolís Oliver (1682–1770), Spanish printer
Isaiah Oliver (born 1996), American football player

J
Jack Oliver (disambiguation), multiple people
Jackie Oliver (born 1942), British auto racing driver
Jaime Oliver (1927–1998), Spanish boxer
James Oliver (disambiguation), multiple people
Jamie Oliver, (born 1975), British chef
Jana Oliver, American author
Javianne Oliver (born 1994), American sprinter
Jay Oliver (born 1959), American musician
Jeff Oliver (born 1965), American football player
Jennie Harris Oliver (1864–1942), American author
Jeremy Oliver (born 1961), Australian wine educator
Jerry Oliver (1930–2020), American basketball coach
Jess Oliver (1926–2011), American musician
Jetti A. Oliver (born 1931), Indian academic administrator
Jimmy Oliver (disambiguation), multiple people
Joan Miquel Oliver (born 1974), Majorcan musician
Joe Oliver (disambiguation), multiple people
John Oliver (disambiguation), multiple people
Jonathan Oliver, British writer
Jordan Oliver (amateur wrestler) (born 1990), American freestyle wrestler
Jordan Oliver (professional wrestler) (born 1999), American professional wrestler
Jorge Oliver (born 1981), Puerto Rican swimmer
José Oliver (born 1954), Puerto Rican archaeologist
Joseph Oliver (disambiguation), multiple people
Josh Oliver (born 1997), American football player
Jovan Oliver (1310–1356), Serbian nobleman
Juan Oliver (disambiguation), multiple people
Julio Oliver (born 1960), Spanish rower

K
Karin Oliver, American singer
Karl Oliver (born 1963), American politician
Keith Oliver, British logistician
Keith Oliver (biathlete) (born 1947), British biathlete
Kelly Oliver (born 1958), American philosopher
Kelly Oliver (boxer) (born 1973), English boxer
Kermit Oliver (born 1943), American painter
Kim Oliver, British actress
Kim Oliver (rugby union) (born 1983), English rugby union footballer
King Oliver (1881–1938), American musician

L
Laureen Oliver, American politician
Lauren Oliver (born 1982), American author
Lekeaka Oliver (1968–2022), Cameroonian soldier
Leonard Oliver (disambiguation), multiple people
Lesley Oliver (born 1948), British canoeist
Lidoro Oliver (1915-?), Argentinian boxer
Lloyd Oliver (1926–2011), American army officer
Louis Oliver (born 1966), American football player
Louis Oliver (poet) (1904–1991), American poet
Lucy Oliver (born 1988), New Zealand runner
Luis Miguel Oliver (born 1959), Spanish rower
Luke Oliver (born 1984), English footballer
Lunsford E. Oliver (1889–1978), American army officer

M
Madge Oliver (1875–1924), British artist
Maggie Oliver (disambiguation), multiple people
Marcus Oliver (born 1995), American football player
Margo Oliver (1923–2010), Canadian food editor
Mariano Puigdollers Oliver (1896–1984), Spanish academic
Marie Watkins Oliver (1854–1944), American graphic designer
Marilene Oliver (born 1977), British sculptor
Martha Oliver (disambiguation), multiple people
Martin Oliver (disambiguation), multiple people
Marvin Oliver (disambiguation), multiple people
Mary Oliver (disambiguation), multiple people
Mayan Oliver (born 1993), Mexican pentathlete
M. C. Oliver (1886–1958), British calligrapher
Meg Oliver (born 1970), American news anchor
Melanie Oliver, New Zealand film editor
Melvin Oliver (disambiguation), multiple people
Michael Oliver (disambiguation), multiple people
Mickey Oliver, American musician
Miquita Oliver (born 1984), British television personality
Montserrat Oliver (born 1966), Mexican fashion model
Muhammad Oliver (born 1969), American football player

N
Nancy Oliver (born 1955), American playwright and screenwriter
Narelle Oliver (1960–2016), Australian artist
Nate Oliver (born 1940), American baseball player
Nate Oliver (ice hockey) (born 1980), American ice hockey executive
N. D. T. Oliver (1886–1948), Brazilian cricketer
Neil Oliver (disambiguation), multiple people
Neville Oliver (born 1944), Australian politician
Nicole Oliver (born 1970), Canadian actress
Nikkita Oliver, American politician and lawyer
Noreen Oliver (born 1960), British businesswoman
Norm Oliver (disambiguation), multiple people
Norman Oliver, English rugby league footballer
Norman Oliver (greyhound trainer) (1927–2012), English greyhound trainer
Nuria Oliver, Spanish computer scientist

P
Pam Oliver (born 1961), American sportscaster
Pamela E. Oliver, American sociologist
Paul Oliver (1927–2017), British historian
Paul Ambrose Oliver (1830–1912), American general
Percy Oliver (1919–2011), Australian swimmer
Percy Lane Oliver (1878–1944), English charity organizer
Peter Oliver (disambiguation), multiple people
Philip Oliver (disambiguation), multiple people
Pom Oliver (born 1952), British explorer

R
Rachel Oliver (born 1971), New Zealand footballer
Rachel Oliver (scientist), English scientist
Ralph A. Oliver (1886–1968), American judge
Raymond Oliver (1909–1990), French restaurateur
Reggie Oliver (disambiguation), multiple people
Reinaldo Oliver (1932–2015), Puerto Rican javelin thrower
Revilo P. Oliver (1908–1994), American professor
Richard Oliver (disambiguation), multiple people
Rob Oliver (born 1977), American artist
Robert Oliver (disambiguation), multiple people
Rochelle Oliver (born 1937), American actress
Rod Oliver (1922–2005), Australian politician
Roland Oliver (1923–2014), American professor
Roland Oliver (judge) (1882–1967), English judge
Ron Oliver, Canadian writer
Russell D. Oliver (1910–1974), American athlete
Ruth Law Oliver (1887–1970), American aviator
Ryan Scott Oliver (born 1984), American composer

S
S. Addison Oliver (1833–1912), American pioneer
Sally Oliver (born 1983), English actress
Samuel Pasfield Oliver (1838–1907), English army officer
Sean Harris Oliver, Canadian actor
Shayne Oliver (born 1988), American fashion designer
Sheila Oliver (born 1952), American politician
Simon Oliver, British comic book writer
Simon Oliver (priest) (born 1971), British priest
Solomon Oliver Jr. (born 1947), American judge
Spencer Oliver (disambiguation), multiple people
Stephen Oliver (disambiguation), multiple people
Steve Oliver (born 1962), American musician
Steven Oliver (footballer) (born 1971), Australian rules footballer
Stuart Oliver (disambiguation), multiple people
Susan Oliver (1932–1990), American actress
Sy Oliver (1910–1988), American musician
Sylvester Oliver (1929–1999), Trinidadian cricketer

T
Terry Oliver (born 1963), Australian cricket coach
Tex Oliver (1899–1988), American football coach
Toby Oliver, Australian cinematographer
Tom Oliver (born 1938), Australian actor
Thomas Oliver (disambiguation), multiple people
Tony Oliver (born 1958), American voice actor
Tony Oliver (footballer) (born 1967), English footballer
Tony Oliver (referee) (born 1931), English football referee
Tracey Oliver (born 1975), Australian Paralympic swimmer
Tracy Oliver, American film writer
Travis Oliver, British actor
Trei Oliver (born 1976), American football coach
Troy Oliver, American musician
True Oliver (1881–1957), Canadian sports shooter

V
Vadaine Oliver (born 1991), English footballer
Valerie Cassel Oliver, American curator
Vaughan Oliver (1957–2019), British graphic designer
Vere Langford Oliver (1861–1942), British surgeon
Vic Oliver (1898–1964), Austrian comedian
Vince Oliver (1915–1985), American athlete

W
Walter Oliver (1883–1957), New Zealander ornithologist
Webster Oliver (1888–1969), American judge
W. H. Oliver (1925–2015), New Zealand poet-historian
Willard Varnell Oliver (1921–2009), American soldier
William Oliver (disambiguation), multiple people
Winslow Oliver (born 1973), American football player

X
Xiomara De Oliver (born 1967), Canadian painter

Fictional characters
Ariadne Oliver, a character in the novels of Agatha Christie
Maxxie Oliver, a character on the television series Skins
Reid Oliver, a character on the television series As the World Turns
Tommy Oliver, a character on the live-action series Power Rangers

See also
Oliver (given name), a page for people with the given name "Oliver"
Oliver (disambiguation), a disambiguation page for "Oliver"
Olivier (surname), a page for people with the surname "Olivier"
Olivier (given name), a page for people with the given name "Olivier"
Olivier (disambiguation), a disambiguation page for "Olivier"
Admiral Oliver (disambiguation), a disambiguation page for Admirals surnamed "Oliver"
Judge Oliver (disambiguation), a disambiguation page for Judges surnamed "Oliver"
General Oliver (disambiguation), a disambiguation page for Generals surnamed "Oliver"
Senator Oliver (disambiguation), a disambiguation page for Senators surnamed "Oliver"

English-language surnames